Jazz Cello is a 1960 album by Ray Brown.

Track listing
 "Tangerine" (Johnny Mercer, Victor Schertzinger) – 3:17
 "Almost Like Being in Love" (Alan Jay Lerner, Frederick Loewe) – 4:14
 "That Old Feeling" (Lew Brown, Sammy Fain) – 4:38
 "Ain't Misbehavin'" (Harry Brooks, Andy Razaf, Fats Waller) – 5:12
 "Alice Blue Gown" (Harry Tierney, Joseph McCarthy) - 2:40
 "Rosalie" (Cole Porter) – 3:06
 "But Beautiful" (Johnny Burke, Jimmy Van Heusen) – 4:00
 "Poor Butterfly" (John Golden, Raymond Hubbell) – 3:17
 "Memories of You" (Eubie Blake, Andy Razaf) – 4:53
 "Rock-a-Bye Your Baby with a Dixie Melody" (Sam M. Lewis, Jean Schwartz, Joe Young) – 2:06

Personnel

Performance
Ray Brown – double bass, cello
Jimmy Rowles – piano
Joe Mondragon – double bass
Dick Shanahan – drums
Don Fagerquist – trumpet
Harry Betts – trombone
Jack Cave – French horn
Bob Cooper, Med Flory, Bill Hood, Paul Horn – saxophones
Russell Garcia – arranger, conductor

References

1960 albums
Ray Brown (musician) albums
Verve Records albums
Albums arranged by Russell Garcia (composer)
Albums conducted by Russell Garcia (composer)